Moushumi is a given name for Bengali women. It may also refer to:
Moushumi, a Bangladeshi film actress
Moushumi Nag, Bangladeshi TV actress
Moushumi Hamid, Bangladeshi film and TV actress
Moushumi Bhowmik, Indian Bengali singer
Moushumi Chatterjee, Bollywood actress with Bengali origin
Moushumi Saha, Bengali television actress